Emmanuel Niyonkuru (20 July 1962 – 1 January 2017) was a Burundian politician.

Life
Niyonkuru gained his higher education at the Faculty of Economic and Administrative Sciences at the University of Burundi from 1987 to 1991.

Later Niyonkuru followed a career in the banking industry. From 1992 to 2015, he worked as the deputy director of Bank of the Republic of Burundi (BRB). Niyonkuru was also elected to the Burundian Senate, representing the district of Muramvya for the 2015 to 2020 term.

In 2015, he was appointed to Burundi's Council of Ministers by Burundian President Pierre Nkurunziza, in charge of water, environment, spatial planning and urban development.

Death
In 2017, as part of the political unrest in Burundi, Niyonkuru was assassinated by gunshot around midnight while on his way home to Rohero, a suburb in the then-capital city of Bujumbura, according to police. Six people, who are believed to be from Rwanda, were arrested in connection to the assassination. Burundian President Pierre Nkurunziza, stated that the crime would not go unpunished. Niyonkuru's assassination is one of many attacks against public faces of Nkurunziza's administration. He was buried at Mpanda in neighbouring Tanzania.

References

1962 births
2017 deaths
Burundian murder victims
Government ministers of Burundi
Assassinated Burundian politicians
People from Muramvya Province
Deaths by firearm in Burundi
2017 murders in Africa
21st-century politicians
Members of the Senate (Burundi)
University of Burundi alumni